The Rebirth (originally titled Underground Love) is the third studio album by American R&B singer Bobby V, who had recorded his first two albums under the name Bobby Valentino. It was released on February 10, 2009. The album was V's first to be released through his record label Blu Kolla Dreams, and debuted at number seven on the U.S. Billboard 200, selling 64,000 copies in its first week. The first single, "Beep", reached No. 55 on the Billboard Hot 100 and No. 6 on the R&B/Hip-Hop chart. The second single, "Hands on Me", reached number 56.

Concept
After V's sophomore disc, Special Occasion, was scarcely supported by his soon-to-be-former label, it was clearly time to re-envision his career. The introspection and soul-searching resulted in The Rebirth. Alongside producers LOS Da Maestro, Raphael Saadiq, Big Fruit and long-time collaborators Tim & Bob, the album, which revolves around relationships, offers a mature effort that will both please loyal fans and win over fickle critics. The album's lead single, "Beep" featuring Yung Joc, was released via iTunes on October 7, 2008 and details the joys of adventurous sex. Bobby notes,

Bobby was especially honored to work with Grammy Award-winner Raphael Saadiq, who produced "Just Me & You" for the project, which covers Saadiq's 1991 hit "Just Me and You." Bobby beams:

Tim & Bob crafted "3 Is the New 2," a Jodeci-tinged joint playing on the phrase "30 is the new 20." On working with the duo Bobby explains:

Additional tracks include "Hands on Me," about a desperate attempt to remain faithful despite a very tempting dalliance, the mid-tempo ballad "Butterfly Tattoo," which evokes '80s Prince, complete with synthesized accents and an electric guitar solo, and the ballad "Give Me Your Heart," on which Bobby takes listeners to church with divine chords and an evangelical falsetto.

The Rebirth also marks V's production debut with the track "Make You Say," inspired by the hook he wrote and sings on Lil Wayne's hit "Mrs. Officer."

Critical reception

AllMusic editor Anthony Tognazzini rated the album three ouf of five stars and wrote: "The third album from smooth crooner Bobby Valentino offers up another dose of svelte, contemporary R&B [...] V. worked with producers Tim & Bob and Carlos McKinney on this set, keeping things up to date with the polished and sleekly digitized sound common in 21st-century R&B. He delivers on bedroom ballads and mid-tempo jams, both of which he carries off with suave, sexy vocal assurance. The Rebirth is in the same mold as Valentino’s first two releases, but fans of those albums will find plenty to savor here."

Chart performance
The Rebirth debuted at number seven on the US Billboard 200, selling 64,000 copies in its first week.

Track listing

Charts

Weekly charts

Year-end charts

Release history

References

2009 albums
Albums produced by Tim & Bob
Bobby V albums